Thelda Marie Williams (née Bender) is an American politician and has served as a city councilor in Phoenix, Arizona since 1985. She has been appointed multiple times as interim Mayor of Phoenix

Biography 
Williams, who had served on the Phoenix city council since 1989, was selected by the council to serve as an interim mayor of the city on March 29, 1994, following the resignation of former mayor Paul Johnson.  Johnson, who was announcing his candidacy for the office of Governor of Arizona, was forced to resign his position due to state law prohibiting current officeholders from seeking another office except in the last year of their term.  Coincidentally, Johnson had first been elevated to the office of mayor under similar circumstances when former mayor Terry Goddard had resigned his office to run for governor in 1990.

Williams chose not to seek election to the office of mayor during the 1994 special election, and resumed her duties as councilwoman on November 3, 1994.  Williams chose to challenge the new incumbent Skip Rimsza for the office during the regular elections in 1995 but was defeated; having not run for reelection in her council seat, she left the city council in 1996.  Williams ran for a new term in 2007 and was elected to a four-year term on the Phoenix city council on September 11, 2007. Williams was elected to another four-year term in 2011.

Williams was once again Phoenix's interim mayor following the resignation of Greg Stanton, who resigned in order to run successfully for U.S. Congress, on May 29, 2018. She did not declare for the ensuing special election.

References

External links

 Official profile

Living people
Mayors of Phoenix, Arizona
Arizona city council members
Women city councillors in Arizona
Women mayors of places in Arizona
20th-century American politicians
21st-century American politicians
20th-century American women politicians
21st-century American women politicians
1941 births